The 1946 Aberdeen South by-election was held on 26 November 1946.  The by-election was held due to the resignation of the incumbent Conservative MP, Sir Douglas Thomson.  It was won by the Conservative candidate Priscilla Buchan.

References

Aberdeen South by-election
Aberdeen South by-election, 1946
Aberdeen South by-election
South, 1946
20th century in Aberdeen
Aberdeen South by-election